'List of fictional states; may refer to:

List of fictional countries
-stan#Fictional